J. S. Lewis is the pen name of [Jon Samuel Lewis]]. 

Other people with the initials J. S. Lewis
 J. Slater Lewis (1852-1901), British engineer, inventor, business manager, and early author on management and accounting

See also 
 C. S. Lewis